Eurybarus or Eurybaros (Ancient Greek: Εὐρύβαρος), Eurybatos (Εὐρύβατος) or Eurybates (Εὐρυβάτης) was a Greek mythological hero, son of Euphemus and a descendant of the river god Axios.

Mythology
Eurybarus was a young man but brave, and by divine inspiration happened to be coming from Kouretis and encountered the young and handsome Alcyoneus (Alkyoneus) as he was being led from Krisa to the cave of drakaina Sybaris on Mount Cirphis to be sacrificed to deliver the Delphians from her menace. Falling in love at first sight with him, and asking why they were doing so, Eurybarus realized that he could neither defend him nor let him perish wretchedly. He tore the wreath from Alcyoneus's head, placed it on his own, and gave orders that he himself should be led forward instead.

As soon as he entered the cavern, Eurybarus dragged Sybaris from her den and threw her off the crags. She struck her head against the footings of Krisa and faded from sight. From that rock sprang a fountain, which the locals call Sybaris.

Note

Reference

Antoninus Liberalis, The Metamorphoses of Antoninus Liberalis translated by Francis Celoria (Routledge 1992). Online version at the Topos Text Project.

Greek mythological heroes
LGBT themes in Greek mythology
Characters in Greek mythology